Fortunato Theodoro Rijna (born 29 May 1938) is a Dutch Antillean weightlifter. He competed at the 1964 Summer Olympics and the 1968 Summer Olympics.

References

External links
 

1938 births
Living people
Dutch Antillean male weightlifters
Olympic weightlifters of the Netherlands Antilles
Weightlifters at the 1964 Summer Olympics
Weightlifters at the 1968 Summer Olympics
Place of birth missing (living people)
Weightlifters at the 1963 Pan American Games
Weightlifters at the 1971 Pan American Games
Pan American Games medalists in weightlifting
Pan American Games silver medalists for the Netherlands Antilles
Medalists at the 1963 Pan American Games
Medalists at the 1971 Pan American Games